Jan Hernych (born 7 July 1979) is a retired professional male tennis player from Czech Republic. Born in Prague, he turned pro in 1998 and achieved his career-high singles ranking of World No. 59 in April 2009. He won one doubles title and was runner-up in 's-Hertogenbosch in 2006.

Currently, he acts as one of the two trainers of the Czech tennis player Markéta Vondroušová, together with Jiří Hřebec.

Career

In 2005, he was the first professional opponent of Andy Murray at the Torneo Godo, a match he won in three sets.

In 2006 he contested his first final on the tour, losing to Mario Ančić in s-Hertogenbosch, Netherlands.

In May 2009 at the BMW Open in Munich, Germany, he joined forces with countryman Ivo Minář to win their first title together in doubles.

In January 2011 at the Australian Open, Hernych posted his best-ever showing in singles play at a Grand Slam event, reaching the 3rd round for the first time. As a qualifier, he defeated Denis Istomin and No. 30 seed Thomaz Bellucci before losing to Robin Söderling.

Hernych has reached 25 singles finals in tenure as a professional tennis player, with his first final coming in 1998 and his most recent being in 2016, a span of almost twenty years. He has a record of 12 wins and 13 losses, including an 0–1 record in ATP Tour-level finals and 8–8 in Challenger finals.

ATP Tour career finals

Singles: 1 (1 runner-up)

Doubles: 1 (1 title)

ATP Challenger and ITF Futures finals

Singles: 24 (12–12)

Performance timelines

Singles

External links
 
 
 
 Hernych World Ranking history

1979 births
Living people
Czech male tennis players
Tennis players from Prague